"Summer Nights" is a song by Dutch DJ and record producer Tiësto. The song features American singer John Legend. It was written by Tiësto, John Ryan, Ruth-Anne Cunningham and Teddy Geiger, and produced by Tiësto and additional produced by Dean Gillard, Matt Ward and Sergio Popken. Released by Musical Freedom on 17 June 2016.

Music video 
On 14 July 2016 Tiësto uploaded the music video for "Summer Nights" on his YouTube and Vevo account.

Track listing 
Digital download
"Summer Nights" — 3:10

Digital download
"Summer Nights" (Tiësto's Deep House Remix) — 3:12

Digital download
"Summer Nights" (MOTi Remix) — 3:31

Digital download
"Summer Nights" (The Him Remix) — 3:10

Charts

Release history

References

2016 singles
2016 songs
Tiësto songs
John Legend songs
Songs written by Tiësto
Songs written by RuthAnne
Songs written by John Ryan (musician)
Songs written by Teddy Geiger
Universal Records singles